The Men's Individual normal hill/10 km at the FIS Nordic World Ski Championships 2013 was held on 22 February 2013. The ski jumping part of the event took place at 10:00 with the cross-country part at 15:00.

Results

Ski jumping 
The ski jumping part was held at 10:00.

Cross-country skiing 
The cross-country skiing part was held at 15:00.

References

FIS Nordic World Ski Championships 2013